Transition zone may refer to:

 Transition zone (Earth), a part of the Earth’s mantle located between the lower mantle and the upper mantle
 Transition zone, the region between the near and far fields of a transmitting antenna 
 Transition zone (TZ), a glandular region of the prostate see Prostate#Zones 
 Zone of transition, a zone in urban planning

See also
 Ecotone, a transition zone between two biomes